Pyrausta amatalis is a species of moth in the family Crambidae. It is found in Bulgaria and Turkey.

The wingspan is 15–16 mm.

References

Moths described in 1903
amatalis
Moths of Europe
Moths of Asia